The Sude is a river in Mecklenburg-Vorpommern and Lower Saxony, Germany. Its source is near Renzow (a district of Schildetal) in western Mecklenburg. It flows through the lake Dümmer See, and continues past Hagenow and Lübtheen. It flows into the Elbe in Boizenburg.

See also
List of rivers of Mecklenburg-Vorpommern
List of rivers of Lower Saxony

 
Rivers of Mecklenburg-Western Pomerania
Rivers of Lower Saxony
Rivers of Germany